Gillotts School is a coeducational secondary school with academy status in Henley-on-Thames, Oxfordshire, England. The school is sited on a 33 acre verdant campus on the edge of Henley, incorporating a large Victorian manor house and two of its associated cottages. There are extensive playing fields, as well as areas of grass, trees and woodland.

History
Gillotts was established as a girls' boarding school in parkland on the fringe of Henley-on-Thames in 1950, under founding headmistress Betty Barford. Gillotts became a coeducational comprehensive school in 1960. The current headteacher is Catharine Darnton, former headteachers include Malcolm White, and David H W Grubb as well as Mr Lockyer. Lotto multi-millionaire winner Gerry Cannings taught history at the school from 1976 until 1983.

Houses
Gillotts school has three houses: Darwin, Pankhurst, and Orwell (named after Charles Darwin, Emmeline Pankhurst, and George Orwell).

Alumni
Alec Hepburn Professional Exeter Chiefs and England Rugby Union rugby player
Simon Kernick (born 1966), crime novelist
Johnny Robinson, 2011 X-Factor finalist
Marcus du Sautoy (born 1965), Simonyi Professor for the Public Understanding of Science and a Professor of Mathematics at the University of Oxford
Andrew Tristem (born 1968), author and journalist

References

Secondary schools in Oxfordshire
Academies in Oxfordshire
Educational institutions established in 1950
1950 establishments in England